The Factory was Andy Warhol's studio in New York City, which had four locations between 1963 and 1987. The Factory became famed for its parties in the 1960s. It was the hip hangout spot for artists, musicians, celebrities and Warhol's superstars. The original Factory was often referred to as the Silver Factory. In the studio, Warhol's workers would make silkscreens and lithographs under his direction.

History 
Due to the mess his work was causing at home, Warhol wanted to find a studio where he could paint. A friend of his found an old unoccupied firehouse on East 87th Street where Warhol began working in January 1963. No one was eager to go there, so the rent was $150 a month. A few months later, Warhol was informed that the building would have to be vacated soon, and in November he found another loft on the fifth floor at 231 East 47th Street in Midtown Manhattan, which would become the first Factory. 

In 1963, artist Ray Johnson took Warhol to a "haircutting party" at Billy Name's apartment, decorated with tin foil and silver paint, and Warhol asked him to do the same scheme for his recently leased loft. Silver, fractured mirrors, and tin foil were the basic decorating materials loved by early amphetamine users of the sixties. Name covered the whole factory in silver, even the elevator. Warhol's years at the Factory were known as the Silver Era. Aside from the prints and paintings, Warhol produced shoes, films, sculptures and commissioned work in various genres to brand and sell items with his name. His first commissions consisted of a single silkscreen portrait for $25,000, with additional canvases in other colors for $5,000 each. He later increased the price of alternative colors to $20,000 each. Warhol used a large portion of his income to finance the Factory.

Billy Name brought in the red couch which became a prominent furnishing at the Factory, finding it on the sidewalk of 47th street during one of his "midnight outings." The sofa quickly became a favorite place for Factory guests to crash overnight, usually after coming down from speed. It was featured in many photographs and films from the Silver era, including Blow Job (1963) and Couch (1964). During the move in 1968, the couch was stolen while left unattended on the sidewalk for a short time.

Many Warhol films, including those made at the Factory, were first (or later) shown at the New Andy Warhol Garrick Theatre or 55th Street Playhouse.

Warhol left in 1967 when the building was scheduled to be torn down. The location is now the entrance to the parking garage of One Dag. 

He then relocated his studio to the sixth floor of the Decker Building at 33 Union Square West near the corner of East 16th Street, near Max's Kansas City, a club which Warhol and his entourage frequently visited. By the time Warhol had achieved a reputation, he was working day and night on his paintings. Warhol used silkscreens so that he could mass-produce images the way corporations mass-produced consumer goods. To increase production, he attracted a ménage of adult film performers, drag queens, socialites, drug addicts, musicians, and free-thinkers who became known as the Warhol Superstars, to help him. These "art-workers" helped him create his paintings, starred in his films, and created the atmosphere for which the Factory became legendary.

In 1968, Warhol was shot by Valerie Solanas at the Factory.

The Factory was revamped and remained there until 1973. It moved to 860 Broadway at the north end of Union Square. Although this space was much larger, not much filmmaking took place there. In 1984 Warhol moved his remaining ventures, no longer including filming, to 22 East 33rd Street, a conventional office building. 

Speaking in 2002, musician John Cale said, "It wasn't called the Factory for nothing. It was where the assembly line for the silkscreens happened. While one person was making a silkscreen, somebody else would be filming a screen test. Every day something new."

Regulars 

Friends of Warhol and "superstars" associated with the Factory included:

 George Abagnalo
 Paul America
 Penny Arcade
 Joey Arias
 Brigid and Richie Berlin
 Jean-Michel Basquiat
 Richard Bernstein
 David Bowie
 Tally Brown
 William S. Burroughs
 Patrick Tilden Close
 Jackie Curtis
 Ronnie Cutrone
 Joe Dallesandro
 Candy Darling
 Johnny Dodd
 Bobby Driscoll
 Eric Emerson
 Danny Fields
 Jane Forth
 Henry Geldzahler
 John Giorno
 Catherine Guinness
 Jerry Hall
 Halston
 Bibbe Hansen
 Keith Haring
 Debbie Harry
 Freddie Herko
 Baby Jane Holzer
 Victor Hugo
 Bianca Jagger
 Mick Jagger
 Miro Bartonik
 Betsey Johnson
 Ray Johnson
 Jed Johnson
 Brian Jones
 Grace Jones
 Udo Kier
 Naomi Levine
 Ulli Lommel
 Gerard Malanga
 Taylor Mead
 Liza Minnelli
 Mario Montez
 Paul Morrissey
 Herbert Muschamp
 Billy Name
 International Velvet
 Nico
 Ondine
 Ruby Lynn Reyner
 Glenn O'Brien
 Anita Pallenberg
 Paige Powell
 Asha Puthli
 Lou Reed
 John Cale
 Rene Ricard
 Keith Richards
 Rotten Rita
 Edie Sedgwick 
 Stephen Shore
 Ingrid Superstar
 Ultra Violet
 The Velvet Underground 
 Viva
 Louis Waldon
 Chuck Wein
 Holly Woodlawn
 Mary Woronov

Work

Music 
The Factory became a meeting place of artists and musicians such as Lou Reed, Bob Dylan, and Mick Jagger, as well as writer Truman Capote. Less frequent visitors included Salvador Dalí and Allen Ginsberg. Warhol collaborated with Reed's influential New York rock band the Velvet Underground in 1965, and designed the noted cover for The Velvet Underground & Nico, the band's debut album. It featured a plastic image of a yellow banana, which users could peel off to reveal a flesh-hued version of the banana. Warhol also designed the album cover for the Rolling Stones' album Sticky Fingers.

Warhol included the Velvet Underground in the Exploding Plastic Inevitable, a spectacle that combined art, rock, Warhol films and dancers of all kinds, as well as live S&M enactments and imagery. The Velvet Underground and EPI used the Factory as a place to rehearse and hang out.

"Walk on the Wild Side", Lou Reed's best-known song from his solo career, was released on his second, and first commercially successful, solo album, Transformer (1972). The song relates to the superstars and life of the Factory. He mentions Holly Woodlawn, Candy Darling, Joe Dallesandro, Jackie Curtis and Joe Campbell (referred to in the song by his Factory nickname Sugar Plum Fairy).

Sexual radicals 
Andy Warhol commented on mainstream America through his art while disregarding its conservative social views. Almost all his work filmed at the Factory featured nudity, graphic sexuality, drug use, same-sex relations and transgender characters in much greater proportion to what was being shown in mainstream cinema. By making the films, Warhol created a sexually lenient environment at the Factory for the "happenings" staged there, which included fake weddings between drag queens, porn film rentals, and vulgar plays. What was called free love took place in the studio, as sexuality in the 1960s was becoming more open and embraced as a high ideal. Warhol used footage of sexual acts between his friends in his work, such as in Blue Movie, a 1969 film directed, produced, written and cinematographed by Warhol. The film, starring Viva and Louis Waldon, was the first adult erotic film depicting explicit sex to receive wide theatrical release in the United States.

Holly Woodlawn and Jackie Curtis were noted drag queens who were part of the Factory group, as was transgender woman Candy Darling. Andy Warhol frequently used these women and other sexual non-conformists in his films, plays, and events. Because of the constant drug use and the presence of sexually liberal artists and radicals, drugged orgies were a frequent happening at the Factory. Warhol met Ondine at an orgy in 1962:

Films 

Warhol started shooting movies in the Factory around 1963, when he began work on Kiss. He screened his films at the Factory for his friends before they were released for public audiences. When traditional theaters refused to screen his more provocative films, Warhol sometimes turned to night-clubs or porn theaters, including the New Andy Warhol Garrick Theatre and the 55th Street Playhouse, for their distribution.

The following list includes all movies filmed entirely or partly at the Factory.

1963
 Kiss
 Rollerskate
 Haircut no. 1
 Haircut no. 2
 Haircut no. 3

1964
 Handjob
 Blow Job
 Screen Tests (1964–1966)
 Jill Johnston Dancing
 Eat
 Couch
 Henry Geldzahler
 Shoulder
 Soap Opera
 Taylor Mead's Ass
 Mario Banana
 Harlot
 13 Most Beautiful Women
 13 Most Beautiful Boys
 50 Fantastics and 50 Personalities

1965
 John and Ivy
 Screen Test #1
 Screen Test #2
 Drink
 Suicide (Screen Test #3)
 Horse
 Vinyl
 Bitch
 Poor Little Rich Girl
 Face
 Afternoon
 Beauty No. 1
 Beauty No. 2
 Space
 Factory Diaries
 Outer and Inner Space
 Prison
 The Fugs and the Holy Modal Rounders
 My Hustler
 Camp
 More Milk, Yvette
 Lupe

1966
 Ari and Mario
 Eating Too Fast (a.k.a. Blow Job #2)
 The Velvet Underground and Nico: A Symphony of Sound
 Hedy (a.k.a. Hedy the Shoplifter)
 The Beard
 Salvador Dalí
 Superboy
 The Chelsea Girls
 The Bob Dylan Story
 Since (a.k.a. The Kennedy Assassination)
 Mrs. Warhol
 Kiss the Boot
 The Andy Warhol Story
 A Christmas Carol
 **** (four stars) (a.k.a. The 24-Hour Movie)

1967
 Imitation of Christ
 I, a Man
 The Loves of Ondine
 Bike Boy
 Tub Girls
 The Nude Restaurant
 Sunset

1968
 Lonesome Cowboys
 Flesh
 Trash (1968–1969)
 Women in Revolt (1968–1971)

1969
 Blue Movie
 Sticks and Stones (by Miro Bartonik)

Locations 

 Studio: 159 East 87th Street 
 Factory: 231 East 47th Street, 1963–67 (the building no longer exists)
 Factory: 33 Union Square, 1967–73 (Decker Building)
 Factory: 860 Broadway, 1973–84 (the building has now been completely remodeled)
 Factory: 158 Madison Ave, Manhattan NY, Feb 2, 1983    to 1987.  This building extended 27 feet along Madison Ave, 96 feet along 33rd St. AKA 22nd 33rd St.  (the building no longer exists)

 Home: 1342 Lexington Avenue
 Home: 57 East 66th Street (Warhol's last home)

References 

1960s in the United States
Andy Warhol
American artist groups and collectives
New York (state) culture
Cultural history of New York City